Peter Alan Corthine (born 19 July 1937) was a footballer who played as an inside forward. Born in England, he represented Singapore at international level.

Career
Corthine began his career at non-league club Leytonstone. After leaving Leytonstone, Corthine played domestic football in Singapore, whilst in the country with the British Army. In December 1957, Corthine signed for Chelsea. Corthine made two appearances for Chelsea, both in 1959, in losses against Nottingham Forest and Arsenal. In March 1960, Corthine signed for Southend United, scoring 24 goals in 73 league games during his time at the club. After leaving Southend, Corthine dropped back into non-league football, playing for Gravesend & Northfleet, Chelmsford City, Clacton Town and Ramsgate Athletic.

International career
Corthine represented Singapore whilst on national service in the country. Corthine scored seven goals for Singapore in the 1957 Merdeka Tournament.

References

1937 births
2015 deaths
Association football forwards
Singaporean footballers
Singapore international footballers
English footballers
People from Highbury
Leytonstone F.C. players
Chelsea F.C. players
Southend United F.C. players
Ebbsfleet United F.C. players
Chelmsford City F.C. players
F.C. Clacton players
Ramsgate F.C. players
English Football League players
English expatriate footballers
Expatriate footballers in Singapore
English expatriates in Singapore